Jacob van der Heyden (1573–1645) was a Flemish Baroque painter, sculptor and engraver.

According to Houbraken he was a painter from Strasbourg who painted for royalty.

According to the RKD he worked in Strasbourg, Frankfurt, and Sweden. and was known for portraits, landscapes and historical allegories. Most of his work that survives today are engravings.  He died in Brussels.

References

1573 births
1645 deaths
16th-century engravers
17th-century engravers
Flemish engravers
Artists from Strasbourg